Rodolfo da Ponte (26 November 1938 – 6 April 2021) was a Paraguayan fencer. He competed in the individual foil event at the 1968 Summer Olympics. He became the first person to represent Paraguay at the Olympic Games. He was the father of fencer Enzo da Ponte. He died from COVID-19 on 6 April 2021.

References

External links
 

1938 births
2021 deaths
Sportspeople from Asunción
Paraguayan male foil fencers
Olympic fencers of Paraguay
Fencers at the 1968 Summer Olympics
Deaths from the COVID-19 pandemic in Paraguay
20th-century Paraguayan people